The 2008–09 Egyptian Premier League was the fifty-second season of the Egyptian Premier League since its establishment in 1948. The league is composed of sixteen teams. Al Ahly SC became the defending champions for the fourth year in a row and the thirty-third time in the league's history. This season began on 8 August 2008 and ended on 24 May 2009.

Television

Multiple television channels broadcast the league:
Egyptian Channel 2
Egyptian Channel 3
Nile Sport
Egyptian Satellite TV
Modern Sport
Dream 1
A-R-T Sports (1, 2, 3, 4)
Al-Riyadiyah (Orbit)
Al-Hayat TV (1, 2)
Egyptian Channel 5 (Alexandria Teams)

Special matches
In Egypt, the most anticipated matches are among the "triangle of power": Al Ahly SC, Zamalek SC, and Ismaily SC.

Al Ahly versus Zamalek SC is one of the top derbies in the region, referred to as the "Egyptian Derby," the "Cairo Derby," or "Africa's Derby." It is a match between two successful clubs, as they have 13 Champions League titles distributed among them, five for Zamalek SC and eight for Al Ahly SC.

The Cairo–Ismailia rivalry is another challenging competition in Egyptian football, as Cairo-based clubs Al Ahly SC and Zamalek SC have mixed relations with the city of Ismailia, home to the Ismaily Sports Club, the third most decorated team in Egypt. The Zamalek SC–Ismaily SC games are usually peaceful as the clubs' boards and fans have had traditionally good relations with each other, while the relationship between Al Ahly SC and Ismaily SC fans have typically not been well.

The reason for the conflict between Al Ahly SC and Ismaily SC fans is not clear, but possibly stems back to the 1967 Six-Day War. Israeli troops forced the people of Ismailia and most of the people living on the Suez Canal to evacuate and leave their homes, going westwards towards the inside of Egypt. Ismaily SC asked Al Ahly SC to host them, but the team refused. This spoiled the relationship between the clubs. During Al Ahly SC's reconstruction period in 2004, Al Ahly SC signed a group of former Ismaily SC players including Mohamed Barakat, Islam El-Shater, and Emad El Nahhas, further destroying the relationship between fans.

Highlights
 Mahmoud "Shikabala" Abd El Razek, the Zamalek SC play-maker, was given a 6-month ban by FIFA due to irregularities in his transfer to Zamalek SC from Greek team PAOK FC  on July 23 and fined 990.000Euros. He made his comeback on November 7th during a match against Al Mokawloon Al Arab SC.
 Ahmed Hassan, Egypt's National Team captain, makes his first entrance to the Egyptian Premier League since 1998 with his new club Al Ahly SC from R.S.C. Andelecht for an undisclosed amount.
 Ghanaian player "Junior" Agogo was transferred from Nottingham Forest FC to Zamalek SC for a reported 800,000 Euros, a record signing of an African player in Egypt.
 Former PetroJet SC's Ivorian forward Zika Jori stirred Egyptian news with his flight to UAE to complete a transfer to Al-Wasl through buying out the remainder of his contract with the Suez-based club amounting to US$350,000. At the time he was the Egyptian Premier League's top goalscorer.
 Al Masry SC's general manager Hossam Hassan was given a 6 match touchline ban by the Egyptian FA and fined 50,000 Egyptian Pounds in Week 5 due to his arguments with the referee and the fourth official in Al Masry SC's away match with Egyptian Telecom.
 Al Ismaili managed to re-enter former forward Mohamed Mohsen Abo Greisha into their ranks after returning from a one-year loan spell in Zhejiang Lucheng of the Chinese Super League. They contracted the striker to a 3 and a half year contract.
 El-Masry Chairman and Port Said businessman Sayed Metwally died during Week 10 due to Cardiac arrest. As such in the second set of matches of the week, teams wore black armbands. He was 68.
 Zamalek SC contained Al Ahly SC in the 2nd leg Cairo derby and drew 0–0. Emerging as the star of the night was Hazem Mohamed Emam, 21-year-old full-back as he passed AL Ahly SC defenses early on in the game.
 The draw with Zamalek SC and Ismaily SC with Zamalek SC winning meant Al Ahly SC needed to win against ENPPI SC at home to maintain a 2-point, but stiff opposition and several refereeing arguments ensured that AL Ahly SC drew 2–2. The trophy had a hand in red and a hand in yellow.
 The last match of the season saw Ismaili SC facing Tersana SC and AL Ahly SC facing Tala'ea El Gaish SC simultaneously . Ismaily SC played their game and won 3–0 and had to wait for AL Ahly SC's match to end. They had suffered a setback with Tala'ea El Gaish SC drawing first blood with a 1–0 lead. Al Ahly SC pushed on during one of the team's most tense moments in the league. In the 88th minute Abo Trika scored a header into the top corner of the goal drawing the game and AL Ahly SC pushed on for the second. That came during the 93rd minute through Ahmed Fathi to score AL Ahly SC's second goal of the game. 19-year-old striker Mohamed Talaat scored his first-ever goal for Al Ahly SC since his transfer to the team a moment later with a goal above the opposing goalkeeper to confirm Al Ahly SC's win and the league ends with tie-breaking match in Al Max Stadium in Alexandria.
 12,000 fans rallied in the 18,000 capacity Al Max Stadium in Alexandria, home of Haras El Hodoud SC. Al Ahly SC faced Ismaily SC in a 1-leg play-off final after both teams scored the same number of points. Al Ahly SC managed a 1–0 victory over their opponents through Angolan pair Gilberto and Flavio. The Angolan winger made a pass inside the box for Flavio to score his 12th goal of the season.

Governorates

Title playoff

MATCH OFFICIALS
Assistant referees:
n/a
n/a
Fourth official: Essam Abd El Fatah

MATCH RULES
90 minutes.
30 minutes of extra-time if necessary.
Penalty shoot-out if scores still level.
Seven named substitutes
Maximum of three substitutions.

League table

Top 2 qualify to CAF African Champions League.
Egyptian Cup winner & 3rd place qualify to CAF Cup.
Bottom 3 relegate to 2009–10 Egyptian Second Division.

Top scorers

Top Scorer by Field Position

Last updated May 24, 2009, 11:59 AM UTC.

Event: Week 30 is over.
 Postponed Games: None

Results

Statistics

Non-Egyptian Players
No. of Non-Egyptian players in the current league 2008–2009:
 41 Players total (Excluding players that have ended their contract mid-season)
 Goalkeepers: 9
 Defenders: 3
 Midfielders: 12
 Forwards: 17
 Ghana has 10 players in the Egyptian League, followed by Côte d'Ivoire with 5 players and Nigeria and Mozambique with 4 players each.

Stadiums

Cairo International Stadium is home to Cairo teams Al Ahly and Zamalek. Ismailia Stadium is home to Ismaily SC. The Borg El Arab Stadium in Alexandria (capacity: 80,000) is currently mainly used for international competition, as it was constructed as part of Egypt's bid to land the 2010 FIFA World Cup.

Clubs stadiums

See also
List of football clubs in Egypt
Egypt Cup
Egyptian Super Cup
List of football clubs in Egypt
Cairo derby

External links
all about Egyptian football
ALL ABOUT EGYTIAN PLAYERS
site about egyptianfootball
RSSSF
RSSSF competition history
Egyptian Premier League schedule, match results, and match downloads
Filgoal.com Egyptian Premier League Live

0
1
Egypt